Anders Åberg (born 4 September 1948 – 8 March 2020) was a Swedish actor. At the 15th Guldbagge Awards he won the award for Best Actor for his role in Kejsaren. He appeared in twelve films and television shows between 1979 and 2000.

Selected filmography
 Långt bort och nära / Near and Far Away (1976)
 Kejsaren / The Emperor (1979)
 Andra dansen / Second Dance (1983)
 Sömnen /  (1984)

References

External links
 
 

1948 births
2020 deaths
Actors from Gothenburg
20th-century Swedish male actors
Swedish male film actors
Swedish male television actors
Best Actor Guldbagge Award winners